Southern Utah News is a newspaper in Kanab, Utah, United States. It succeeded the Kane County Standard, a paper founded in 1929, and has run continuously under the Southern Utah News name since 1953.  It serves communities in Southern Utah and Northern Arizona and has a circulation of 1,500 and is owned by Megan and Neal Brown.

References

External links
Official website

Newspapers published in Utah
Weekly newspapers published in the United States